The UEFA European Under-18 Championship 1956 Final Tournament was held in Hungary. During this edition, only group matches were played and no winner was declared. This was done to prevent an excess of competition. Hungary, Italy, Romania and Czechoslovakia were the four group winners.

Teams
The following teams entered the tournament:

 
 
 
 
 
 
 
 
 
  (host)

Group A

Group B

Group C

Group D

External links
Results by RSSSF

UEFA European Under-19 Championship
Under-18
1956
Euro
March 1956 sports events in Europe
April 1956 sports events in Europe
1956 in youth association football